Paul Eric Bosko, also known as Rosko, is an American singer, songwriter, musician and producer.   He is perhaps best known as a recording artist for his 2005 single "Love Is A Drug" which reached number 1 on the U.S. Billboard Dance Chart, and was produced by John Creamer & Stephane K.   He is also known for his collaborations with Grammy Award-Nominated Electronic/Dance artist Nadia Ali, which include their 2006 duet "Something To Lose" for Ultra Records, and the song "Promises" on Ali's 2009 solo album "Embers."

History
Paul Bosko began collaborating on house music projects in 2003 with New York-based DJ/producers John Creamer & Stephane K, and when Creamer and his club scene counterparts nicknamed him "Rosko," it eventually stuck and became his moniker as a recording and performing artist in the electronic and dance music industry.

Paul Bosko's musical work, ranging from folk-pop to alternative dance, sometimes featured DJ/producer Lance Jordan in a co-producing role, and occasionally as co-writer and lead guitarist as well.  Bosko and Jordan met in 2001 at a Music and Internet Expo sponsored by mp3.com at Madison Square Garden.

In 2003 the duo were shopping an album they made together, "Paul Bosko/Dressed To Play," when they began searching for remixers, and caught the attention of Creamer & K, who had just been named 2002 Remixers of the Year by Remix Magazine.  C & K joined the project as producers.

The 2005 anthem Love Is A Drug would become his first big hit on the Billboard Hot Dance Music/Club Play chart, going all the way to #1.  The fusion of Rosko's bluesy, classic guitar-rock style, combined with the pioneering house music grooves of the production team, is self-described as "Rock/House" (as in "rock the house," or "to infuse house music with rock and roll elements").

"Love Is A Drug" went on to appear on several dance compilations, including Grammy Award-winning Peter Rauhofer's 2006 album "I Love New York."  The single was followed by another Creamer and K collaboration, this time a duet with Nadia Ali of iio, titled "Something To Lose." The duet was signed by Ultra Records, and championed on the UK's BBC Radio 1 by influential DJ and tastemaker Pete Tong. Subsequently, Ultra quickly licensed the record to Roger Sanchez's "Release Yourself vol. 5," as well as to the Global Underground solo debut of DJ/Producer Sharam (of the Grammy Award-winning duo Deep Dish), titled "Dubai."  Another Rosko single, "Milkbone," was released in September 2006 by Lance Jordan's own independent label, Dusk Recordings.

See also
 List of number-one dance hits (United States)
 List of artists who reached number one on the US Dance chart

References

External links
Myspace page

American dance music groups
American house music groups
American house musicians
American male singer-songwriters
American singer-songwriters
Living people
Year of birth missing (living people)